A common year starting on Monday is any non-leap year (i.e., a year with 365 days) that begins on Monday, 1 January, and ends on Monday, 31 December. Its dominical letter hence is G. The most recent year of such kind was 2018 and the next one will be 2029 in the Gregorian calendar, or likewise, 2019 and 2030 in the Julian calendar, see below for more. This common year is one of the three possible common years in which a century year can begin on and occurs in century years that yield a remainder of 300 when divided by 400. The most recent such year was 1900 and the next one will be 2300.

Any common year that starts on Sunday, Monday or Tuesday has two Friday the 13ths: those two in this common year occur in April and July. Leap years starting on Sunday share this characteristic, but also have another in January.

In this common year, Martin Luther King Jr. Day is on its earliest possible date, January 15, Valentine's Day, U.S. Independence Day and Halloween fall on a Wednesday, President's Day is on February 19, Saint Patrick's Day is on a Saturday, Juneteenth is on a Tuesday, Memorial Day is on May 28, Labor Day is on September 3, Thanksgiving is on its earliest possible date, November 22, and Christmas is on a Tuesday.

Calendars

Applicable years

Gregorian calendar 
In the (currently used) Gregorian calendar, along with Sunday, Wednesday, Friday or Saturday, the fourteen types of year (seven common, seven leap) repeat in a 400-year cycle (20871 weeks). Forty-three common years per cycle or exactly 10.75% start on a Monday. The 28-year sub-cycle only spans across century years divisible by 400, e.g. 1600, 2000, and 2400.

400 year cycle (add any multiple of 400 to a number in the following list to get a year with this calendar.)

century 1:   1, 7, 18, 29, 35, 46, 57, 63, 74, 85, 91

century 2:   103, 114, 125, 131, 142, 153, 159, 170, 181, 187, 198

century 3:   210, 221, 227, 238, 249, 255, 266, 277, 283, 294, 300

century 4:   306, 317, 323, 334, 345, 351, 362, 373, 379, 390

Julian calendar 
In the Julian calendar, the fourteen types of year (seven common, seven leap) repeat in a 28-year cycle (1461 weeks). This sequence occurs exactly once within a cycle, and every common letter thrice.

As the Julian calendar repeats after 28 years that means it will also repeat after 700 years, i.e. 25 cycles. The year's position in the cycle is given by the formula ((year + 8) mod 28) + 1). Years 6, 12 and 23 of the cycle are common years beginning on Monday. 2017 is year 10 of the cycle. Approximately 10.71% of all years are common years beginning on Monday.

References 

Gregorian calendar
Julian calendar
Monday